Lawrence Muggerud (born January 28, 1968) professionally known by his stage name DJ Muggs, is an American DJ, audio engineer and record producer. He is a member of Cypress Hill, a member of the trip hop band Cross My Heart Hope To Die and the leader of hip hop and art collective Soul Assassins. 

During his career he produced tracks for House of Pain, Funkdoobiest, Daddy Freddy, Pavlos Fyssas, Die Antwoord, Westside Gunn, remixed songs for Janet Jackson, U2, Kaliphz, Simply Red, Depeche Mode, and collaborated with Tricky, GZA, Sick Jacken, Planet Asia, Ill Bill, Meyhem Lauren and Roc Marciano. As part of Cypress Hill, he received three Grammy nominations for "Insane in the Brain", "I Ain't Goin' Out Like That" and "Throw Your Set in the Air".

Life and career
Of Italian descent, Muggs was born in Queens borough of New York City, and was adopted into a Norwegian family. He moved to Bell Gardens at age fourteen, and got his start DJing for hip hop group The 7A3, who put out one album in 1988 before disbanding.

Cypress Hill (1988–2004)
After linking up with B-Real and Sen Dog to form the group Cypress Hill, he went on to produce seven studio albums with the group from 1991 to 2004. Of the seven, four reached platinum status, and three gold. Meanwhile, he scored hits on the side with Ice Cube's "Check Yo Self" and House of Pain's "Jump Around". During Cypress Hill's early years, DJ Muggs met The Alchemist and his Dilated Peoples brethren on tour, deciding to take the young producer under his wing, providing a jump-start for his career.

Soul Assassins
In 1997, Muggs released an album under the name Soul Assassins. The album, Soul Assassins I, reached #86 on the Billboard 200 and earned critical praise. Produced by Muggs, it featured Dr. Dre, B-Real, La the Darkman, Mobb Deep, RZA, GZA, Goodie Mob, KRS-One and Wyclef Jean. In 2000 he returned to the Soul Assassins with Soul Assassins II, which reached only #178 on the charts but garnered similarly positive reviews. He also put out the record Dust, an atmosphere-heavy trip hop affair with Greg Dulli, Amy Trujillo and Everlast on vocals. After the 2004 album Till Death Do Us Part, which reached #23 on the Billboard 200, Cypress Hill went on a hiatus from recording, enabling its members to focus more on their side projects.

Further solo projects and return of Cypress Hill (2005–2010)
In 2005, DJ Muggs teamed up with Wu-Tang Clan's GZA for the album Grandmasters, the first project released on his label Angeles Records. Patterned after a chess game, it received positive reviews; Muggs also announced a Soul Assassins III album, produced jointly by himself and Alchemist, reportedly to be preceded by a record called Cloak & Dagger, also featuring Alchemist. Instead, Muggs produced an album for Psycho Realm member Sick Jacken, Legend of the Mask and the Assassin two years later, in 2007. In 2008, Muggs announced that his album with California rapper Planet Asia would be the third Soul Assassins album, but the two released Pain Language later that year as a simple collaboration.

Before the release of his solo album Smoke n Mirrors in 2009, B-Real reported that Cypress Hill has been working on an album for roughly a year. Currently in the mixing phase, Muggs has produced half of the album's material so far, going to DJ Premier, Pete Rock and Mike Shinoda for the rest. In 2009, Muggs entered the Gumball 3000 cross-country race, and on June 23, 2009, Soul Assassins: Intermission was released, featuring RZA, Prodigy, Evidence, The Alchemist and Bun B. The first single for the album was "Gangsta Shit" by Bun B and M1. Despite its high-profile guest list, the release was met with lukewarm reception, and Muggs later clarified its status as a preview before the release of Soul Assassins III, the next full-fledged installment of his Soul Assassins series. Muggs plans next on recording his 5th V.S. album with group member B-Real. and in 2013 he confirmed a VS album with Meyhem Lauren as well.

On the Soul Assassins official website, it was also revealed that Muggs contributed production to Apathy's song "Fear Itself" from rapper's Honkey Kong album, which was released August 23, 2011.

In 2011, Muggs announced the release of a new album entitled Bass for Your Face, which he described as a 'West Coast dubstep album'. In October 2011, Muggs confirmed via his Twitter account that Public Enemy frontman Chuck D would contribute to the album, and the lead single would feature UK artist Dizzee Rascal and Los Angeles upstart MC Bambu.

Cross My Heart Hope To Die 
Muggs returned to the trip hop genre by teaming up with vocalist Brevi, fellow producer Andrew Kline (from the hardcore punk band Strife) and Sean Bonner, who served as a curator, hacker and creative technologist of the project. CMHHTD released their debut four-track self-titled extended play on April 2, 2013, and it was promoted by three music videos "Wild Side", "Miracles" and "Roller Coasting". On July 29, 2014, the band released their second extended play, Vita E Morte, it was supported by two music videos "Two Shots" and "Tears Of God". Both EPs were released via Alpha Pup Records and also were released later as Cross My Heart Hope To Die eight-track album.

Discography

Studio albums
 1997: Muggs Presents... The Soul Assassins Chapter I
 2000: Muggs Presents Soul Assassins II
 2003: Dust
 2009: DJ Muggs Presents Soul Assassins: Intermission
 2013: Bass for Your Face
 2018: Soul Assassins: Dia del Asesinato
 2020: Winter
 2021: Dies Occidendum
 2021: Winter 2

Extended plays
 2012: Sound Boy Killa
 2012: Sound Clash Business
 2018: Frozen Angels 
 2019: Members Only

Mixtapes
 2000: Cornerstone Mixtape 16: Kalifornication (with Insane Mixaken)
 2002: Soul Assassins Mixtape Vol. One
 2004: The Last Assassin (with Chace Infinite)
 2005: Mash Up Radio (Hip Hop vs. Rock) Vol. 1 (with DJ Warrior)
 2005: Mash Up Radio (Hip Hop vs. Rock) Vol. 2 (with DJ Warrior)
 2005: Machine Shop Mixtape Volume 1
 2006: Soul Assassins: Take Aim
 2006: Mash-Up Radio: The Aftermash (with Ern Dog)
 2011: The Los Angeles, Philippines Mixtape (with Bambu)
 2012: Rock the Bells Official Mixtape

Collaborations
 1999: Juxtapose (with Tricky and Grease)
 2005: Grandmasters (vs. GZA)
 2007: Legend of the Mask and the Assassin (vs. Sick Jacken feat. Cynic)
 2008: Pain Language (with Planet Asia)
 2010: Kill Devil Hills (vs. Ill Bill)
 2017: Gems from the Equinox (with Meyhem Lauren)
 2018: Kaos (with Roc Marciano)
 2019: Hell's Roof (with Lil' Eto)
 2019: Tuez-Les Tous (with Mach-Hommy)
 2019: Medallo (with Crimeapple)
 2019: Kill Em All (with Mach-Hommy)
 2019: Dump Assassins (with Tha God Fahim)
 2020: Kilogram (with Al Divino)
 2021: Death & the Magician (with Rome Streetz)
 2021: Rammellzee (with Flee Lord)
 2021: Mile Zero (with Yelawolf)
 2021: American Cheese (with Hologram)
 2021: Cartagena (with Crimeapple)
 2022: Gold (with Rigz)
 2022: Sin Cortar (with Crimeapple)
 2022: What They Hittin 4 (with Jay Worthy)

Cypress Hill

Cross My Heart Hope To Die
 2013: Cross My Heart Hope to Die EP
 2014: Vita E Morte
 2014: Cross My Heart Hope to Die

Awards and nominations 

!
|-
|align=center|1993
|"Insane in the Brain"
|rowspan="3"| Grammy Award for Best Rap Performance by a Duo or Group
|
|rowspan="3"| 
|-
|align=center|1994
|"I Ain't Goin' Out Like That"
|
|-
|align=center|1995
|"Throw Your Set in the Air"
|
|-

References

External links

Interview With HipHopDX

1968 births
Living people
American adoptees
American hip hop DJs
Cypress Hill members
American male musicians
American audio engineers
American hip hop musicians
Musicians from Los Angeles
20th-century American musicians
21st-century American musicians
Musicians from Queens, New York
American hip hop record producers
American people of Italian descent
Anti- (record label) artists
Columbia Records artists